Ó Siadhail / uaSiadhail / uaSiadgail is a Gaelic-Irish surname.

Overview 

There were at least three families of this name in Gaelic Ireland.

 Ó Siadhail of Ui Maine, now east County Galway.
 Ó Siadhail of Uí Failghe, now County Offaly and County Laois.
 Ó Siadhail of Tír Chonaill, now County Donegal.

Little is recorded of the Ui Maine family. Those of Uí Failghe and Tír Chonaill were ollamhs of medicine, hereditary physicians to the ruling families in the respectives kingdoms and environs. It is not clear if the two were branches of the one family, or unrelated families who happened to bear the same surname.

Current forms 

The surname is now generally anglicised as O'Shiel, Shiel, Sheil, Sheils, Sheals, Sheal and Sheilds (or Shiels and Shields), but the original form, Ó Siadhail, is used by persons who are Gaelic and conscious of their genealogy.

Famous bearers 
Notable people named Ó Siadhail or one of its variants include:

 Eoghan Carrach Ó Siadhail, poet, fl. c. 1500-1550.
 Séamus Ó Siaghail, c. 1600 - 1655.
 Michael Shiell, c. 1663 - 1700.
 James Shields, 1806-1879. 
 Micheal O'Siadhail, poet, born 1947.
 Kevin Shields, 1963 -
 Brooke Shields, 1965 -
 Jimi Shields, 1967 - 
 , 1950-2006.
 Damien Shiels, author of The Irish in the American Civil War
Professor Paul Shiels, (1961-) Scientist, alumnus Trinity College Dublin, University of Glasgow, Professor of Geroscience, University of Glasgow,
 Ricardo Shiel (c. 1756 - 1816) and his brother Edward Shiel (c. 1762 - 1818), merchant shipping, Rafael de la Viesca 10, Cadiz, Spain. Sons of Risteard Shiel, an exile from Omagh in Tyrone, Ireland. Their cousin James Shiel, RIAI (c. 1785 - 1850), Irish architect, late Georgian and Edwardian styles (Irish Architectural Archive, IAA). Their descendants: Richard Lalor Shiel (1791-1871), M.P., Catholic Emancipation, Ireland, 1829 (Roman Catholic Relief Act). His brother Major General Sir Justin Shiel (1803-1871), Ireland, British Army and Persian (Iranian) Army. Justin Shiel's descendants: Edward Shiel (1851-1915), Ireland, M.P., Irish national Party. Democratic Senator Colonel George Knox Shiel (1825-1893), Oregon U.S.A., (Biographical Directory of the United States Congress). Thomas Martin Shiel (1911-1998), philologist, alumnus University College Dublin, Ireland. Dr. Mark Shiel (1970-), author in filmic studies and critical theory, alumnus Trinity College Dublin, Birbeck College London and fellow/reader King's College London. Sonia Shiel (1975-), artist, alumnus National College of Art Dublin, Ireland. Family name: variously Shiel, O'Shiel, uaSiadgail, uaSiadhail and mistakenly Sheil (e.g., Though R. L. Shiel, M.P. is recorded in U.K Parliamentary Records as Shiel; he is mistakenly called Sheil, an anglo rendition of his name. His Probate papers in Dublin and Florence are under the name Shiel. Consult University College Dublin Archives, ref IE UCDA P23, "The Papers of Richard Lalor Shiel". In his account of the "Star Chamber", UK Prime Minister Benjamin Disraeli otherwise Lord Beaconsfield comments unambiguously on R. L. Shiel. 1828.). Further confusion arises when Matthew Phipps Shiell (1865 – 1947), a British West Indian author, uses the pen-name M. P. Shiel. His legal surname is "Shiell".

See also
 Shiel

External links 
 http://www.irishtimes.com/ancestor/surname/index.cfm?fuseaction=Go.&UserID=
 http://www.libraryireland.com/SocialHistoryAncientIreland/II-XIV-1.php
 http://freepages.genealogy.rootsweb.ancestry.com/~grannyapple/SHIELDS%20DNA/DNA%20Test%20Results.html

References 

 Medicine and Medical Doctors, Chapter XIV, A Smaller Social History of Ancient Ireland, Patrick Weston Joyce, 1906.

Surnames
Irish families
Irish Brehon families
Surnames of Irish origin
Irish-language surnames
Families of Irish ancestry
Irish medical families